Slotervaart (short for Tuinstad Slotervaart) is a neighborhood in the far western part of Amsterdam, Netherlands. The area is named after the canal Slotervaart; the first houses were built in 1955.

Just outside the residential area there is a hospital, the Slotervaartziekenhuis (since 1976), and the Netherlands Cancer Institute (NKI) (since 1979).

Since 1990 Slotervaart was a part of the urban district of Slotervaart-Overtoomse Veld, which was renamed in 2004 as shortly Slotervaart. In 2010 however this borough was merged with surrounding boroughs into the larger borough Amsterdam Nieuw-West.

References 

Amsterdam Nieuw-West
Neighbourhoods of Amsterdam